Merci is a French word meaning "thank you".

Merci may refer to:
in music
 Merci (Alpha Blondy album), 2002
 Merci (Florent Pagny album), 1990
 Merci (Magma album), 1984

in other contexts
 Merci (candy), a brand of chocolate manufactured by August Storck KG
 Merci (company), a Czech laboratory equipment company
 MERCI Retriever, a medical device used for treating ischemic strokes
 Movement for Citizens' Commitment and Awakening (French: Mouvement pour l'engagement et le réveil des citoyens, abbreviated MERCI), a political party in Benin led by Séverin Adjovi